Manathana is a village in Peravoor Grama Panchayat of Kannur district, Kerala, India.

Manathana belongs to Peravoor Assembly constituency under Kannur Loksabha constituency. The village has signs of very early human settlement. This small village has seven temples and remnants of some other temples or such structures. The history of Pazhassi Raja, the Lion of Kerala, has been related to this small village. The folk songs of this region indicate that an earlier form of democratic administrative system had prevailed here.

Location
The Aralam Wildlife Sanctuary is located nearby.

Historical Importance

Pazhassi Raja's Kizhakke Kovilakm was situated in Manathana.

Demographics
As of 2011 Census, Manathana village had a population of 15,935 with 7,554 males and  8,381 females. The sex ratio of Manathana was 1,109 higher than state average of 1,084. Population of children in the age group 0-6 was 1,619 (10.2%) where 800 are males and 819 are females. Manathana had an overall literacy of 93.4% where male literacy stands at 96.3% and female literacy was 90.9%.

Educational Institutions 
 Govt. Higher Secondary School, Manathana

Tourism 
Manathana and the surrounding areas have a choice of tourism attractions.

 Aralam Wildlife Sanctuary
 Pazhassi Dam and garden
 Kanjirakkolly waterfalls
 Coorg valleys
 Palchuram
  Barapole hydroelectric project
 Central State farm at Aralam
 Steel girder bridge at Iritty built by British
 Wayanad

Transportation
The national highway passes through Thalassery town. Mangalore and Mumbai can be accessed on the northern side and Cochin and Thiruvananthapuram can be accessed on the southern side.  The road to the east of Iritty connects to Mysore and Bangalore. The nearest railway station is on Thalassery. The nearest airport is Kannur. There are airports at Kannur and Calicut.

References

External links

Villages near Iritty